Leonardo Lavalle was the defending champion, but did not participate this year.

Jeff Tarango won the tournament, beating Stéphane Simian in the final, 4–6, 6–3, 6–4.

Seeds

Draw

Finals

Top half

Bottom half

References

 Main Draw

Tel Aviv Open
1992 ATP Tour